The Khoikhoi–Dutch Wars were a series of conflicts that took place in the last half of the 17th century in what was known then as the Cape of Good Hope (today it refers to a smaller geographic spot), in the area of present-day Cape Town, South Africa, between Dutch colonizers who came from the Netherlands and the local African people, the indigenous Khoikhoi, who had lived in that part of the world for millennia.

The arrival of the permanent settlements of Europeans, under the Dutch East India Company, at the Cape of Good Hope in 1652 brought them into the land of the local people, such as the Khoikhoi (called Hottentots by the Dutch), and the Bushmen (also known as the San), collectively referred to as the Khoisan. While the Dutch traded with the Khoikhoi, serious disputes broke out over land ownership and livestock. This resulted in attacks and counter-attacks by both sides which were known as the Khoikhoi–Dutch Wars that ended in the eventual defeat of the Khoikhoi. The First Khoikhoi-Dutch War took place from 1659 – 1660 and the second from 1673 – 1677.

First Khoikhoi-Dutch War

Beginning of the War 
The arrival of the Dutch East India Company began a complicated series of relations between the Khoisan and the Dutch. The chief Hessequa Khoisan opened up trade with the Dutch, leading to economic prosperity for the Khoisan. The extended trade offers opened up the Khoisan to infiltration by the Dutch. Dutch began disrupting lands used by Khoisan for seasonal farming, forcing adaptation of the Khoisan in the form of finding new resources or rationing existing resources. The Khoikhoi nomadic people were disgruntled by the disruption of their seasonal visit to the area for which purpose they grazed their cattle at the foot of Table Mountain only to find European settlers occupying and farming the land. Their leader Doman lived in the Fort de Goede Hoop at the time. One night Doman left the fort to join his clan where after he led several cattle-lifting excursions against the settlers. In 1659 the settlements farmers protested against the continual cattle theft and called an urgent council meeting with Jan van Riebeeck. The council, consisting of representatives of the Dutch East India Company and free burghers gathered to discuss the protest made by the free burgher farmers. The Company was not in favor for war and the free burghers made it clear that their only desire were to live in peace and trade with the natives, yet they could not endure any more harassment. The free burghers and the Company stated that they could not see any other way to attain peace and quietness in the area than to declare war on Doman's clan.

Settlements response 
During the event of the council meeting, Doman and his party attacked a farm and murdered the cattle herder, a boy named Simon Janssen. News of the attack reached the fort soon thereafter and panic ensued throughout the settlement. One of the Khoisan clans called the Strandlopers, who lived near the Fort at the time, fled from Table Valley fearing to get caught up in the conflict. The burghers who were unable to defend themselves were evacuated to the Fort, while guards were stationed to protect the families who remained on the farms. Additional soldiers arrived by ship and guard houses were erected along the border of the settlement. Doman's clan were however difficult to apprehend.

Jan van Riebeeck decided upon the following measures as a temporary measure to make safe the area; deepening the existing redoubts, build additional three watch-houses, put up a strong fence, mounted patrols along the line and Boerboel dogs on farms. The fence line became the official border of the settlement.

Khoisan involvement 
During the war, a devastating virulent sickness occurred among the cattle of the settlers causing the death of at least four out of five of some of the flocks. The settlers instituted a prayer meeting every Wednesday to pray for relief from the dire situation and for victory. Another Khoisan clan under the leadership of Oedasoa, who were also at war with Doman's clan approached the settlers and offered an alliance. The Council decided to accept Oedasoa's advice on expedition matters but not to accept any men from his clan for the purpose of conducting military operations since they felt that additional manpower were unnecessary and costly. The arrival of 105 additional European soldiers greatly strengthened the garrison at the Cape. The additional men enabled the settlers to carry out several expeditions, of which most were unsuccessful. The Council approached Harry, the leader of the Strandloper clan for assistance with regards to expeditions, who pointed out that Doman's people had placed men as sentinels on every hill.

Skirmishes 
Skirmishes between the mounted patrols and Doman's people erupted on several occasions where Doman's men were defeated owing to the advantage in weapons on the side of the settlers. During a particular skirmish, Doman was wounded and his party dispersed from the area. After the conflict ended, the Strandloper clan moved back to the area near the Fort where they had lived before and a time of peace emerged.

Peace treaty 
On 6 April 1660 Doman and his followers arrived at the Fort and concluded a treaty. Both parties agreed that neither would molest each other in future and that Doman's people would only enter the settlements territory, and remain on the designated paths as pointed out, for the purpose of trade in order to replace the stolen cattle. It was further declared that the free burghers and the Company would retain ownership of the land occupied by them and that the settlers would not treat the natives harshly for what had happened during the war, upon which all parties agreed.

Second Khoikhoi-Dutch War

Beginning of the war
In 1672 the settlement dispatched explorers in search of Khoisan to trade with since they relied on trade with the Khoisan to obtain livestock for passing ships. The explorers discovered that the Chainouqua and Cochoqua clans were at war with each other. In November 1672 the governor at the Cape sent three hunters to Riebeek's Kasteel to hunt for meat when upon their arrival they were ambushed and robbed by Gonnema's gang. Gonnema, the chief of the Cochoquas, frequently plundered neighbouring Khoisan camps in the area. Gonnema was displeased because of the assistance which the settlement provided in trade with his enemies the Chainouquas. In June 1673 the governor sent another hunting party consisting of nine men with two wagons to hunt large game, the hunters went up into the mountains where they were surrounded and captured by the Cochoquas who detained them for several days and then murdered them at a place called Moordkuil.

Cochoquas attack on Saldanha Bay
Cochoquas, disguised as traders, arrived at the Company's trading post at Saldanha Bay on 6 July 1673 when suddenly they attacked and murdered four of the soldiers stationed there. The Chochoquas then plundered the outpost. Only one soldier managed to escape.

Settlements response
After receiving news of these attacks the counsel resolved to send soldiers in search of the Cochoquas. Ensign Hieronymus Cruse assembled and led 36 Freeburghers and 36 Company soldiers to the area of Twenty Four Rivers. Reinforcements in the form of eighteen horsemen under leadership of freeburgher officer Elbert Diemer were dispatched a few days later to assist Hieronymus Cruse in his mission.
The settlements combined forces marched across the area of Twenty Four Rivers when their scouts discovered a Cochoqua kraal among the mountains on 18 July. By the time the forces arrived at the kraal it had been abandoned. They found property belonging to the murdered settlers inside the abandoned huts. The following day the horsemen followed the fugitives resulting in the Chochoquas fleeing into the mountains and leaving their cattle behind. Hieronymus Cruse then took possession of the cattle ordered his forces to return to the fort.
When the forces stopped to set up camp for the night the Cochoquas mobilised an attack in an attempt to recover the cattle, during the skirmish one burgher was wounded and two horses killed while about twelve Cochoquas were fatally wounded. Gonnema failed to recover the livestock and the expedition forces reached the ford again on 25 July 1673 with eight hundred head of horned cattle and nine hundred sheep.

Dutch-Chainouqua Alliance
The Chainouquas, who were already at war with the Cochoquas, now allied with the settlers. On 20 August the Chainouquas with more than a hundred of their people arrived at the fort. They had captured four of Gonnema's followers and delivered them to the governor to be tried by a court. They were found guilty of participation in the murder of the burghers and were sentenced to death at the hands of the Chainouquas.

The war had been suspended for some months, owing to a fatal disease which had broken out among the Khoisan people. On 24 March 1674 the Chainouquas reported that their spies had located Gonnema's camp at the Little Berg River at Tulbagh Kloof whereafter it was resolved to send combined forces to that location. There were fifty freeburghers under command of Wouter Moster, four hundred Chainouquas under command of captains Klaas, Koopman, Schaecher, and Kuiper, and fifty soldiers under Ensign Cruse, who was also commandant-general of the expedition.
The Cochoquas anticipated an attack and fled leaving their possessions and livestock behind. The army seized eight hundred head of horned cattle and four thousand sheep. The spoils were divided among the soldiers and the Company.

1675 Cochoqua Offensive
In November 1675 Gonnema led a surprise attack at Tigerberg where the Chainouquas kept their cattle during which several of the herders were killed and a large portion of their cattle were taken. During the skirmish fifteen Cochoquas were killed. By the time reinforcements from the settlement arrived Gonnema had already escaped into the mountains.

1676 Dutch-Chainouqua Offensive
In 1676 the council dispatched a military expedition under the command of Lieutenant Cruse, in search of the Cochoquas, consisting of fifty foot-soldiers, twenty-three horsemen, fifty burghers and a large band of Chainouquas. They were unable to track down the Cochoquas location. It was then decided to send a spy named Jacob to locate Gonnema, the spy returned with news that the Cochoquas were at war with other Khoisan clans named the Namaquas and the Chariguriquas. Another force were dispatched under guidance of the spy Jacob to Saldanha Bay where they found and killed several of Gonnema's followers. They seized one hundred and sixty-five head of horned cattle and thirty sheep which was taken by the Chainouquas as spoils of war.

1677 peace treaty
On 8 June 1677 Cochoqua messengers arrived at the Castle of Good Hope to initiate peace negotiations of which the council were in favour. On 24 June a delegation of high ranking Cochoquas arrived at the Castle with nine head of cattle to negotiate for peace. The following terms were agreed upon; trade relations between the Cochoqua and the Dutch East India Company would be restored and the Cochoquas would deliver as tribute thirty head of cattle yearly to the return fleet of the Company. Furthermore, the Cochoquas would instruct their people to refrain from stealing livestock from the settlers and their allies and severely punish those who commit such a crime. The Cochoquas vowed not to wage war against any of the Companies allies.

Conclusion
Some modern scholars have observed that superior war-making ability was not the only means whereby the Dutch forced the Khoikhoi to submit and concluded that, in addition to having superior technology, European settlers also used bureaucratic support from the Dutch East India Company to occupy better watered and more productive lands in the interior, whereas Khoikhoi pastoralists were denied access to these lands. The settlers could defend these lands from Khoikhoi by firearms:

 The disappearance of these people from the land can be attributed to the conflicts of the Khoikhoi Dutch Wars and the political and legal aftermath in the resulting areas. The hunter-gatherer lifestyle associated with the Khoisan faced new barriers from legal changes around activities necessary to maintain a hunter gatherer society. Additional contributions to the disintegration of the Khoisan ethnicity revolve around the loose structure of the Khoisan society. The relative lack of a strong, Khoisan social structure created an environment in which Khoisan people were ready to acculturate to the Dutch and Bantu speaking intruders given the collapse of the existing Khoisan social structure or disruption of the existing lands being used for survival by the Khoisan. Khoisan people were spread all throughout the southern portion of Africa as seen in Map 1. The portions of land seen in Map 1 were commonly shared with the Bantu people, but the alignment of the Bantu with Dutch goals contributed to the downfall of Khoisan political influence in Southern Africa. The loss of Khoisan political influence has also led to the decline in the commonality of the Khoisan language. Khoisan pottery was one of the few expressions of Khoisan language and most remnants of this style of pottery have been wiped out. The final conclusion of the Khoikhoi-Dutch wars is that the Khoisan people along with their culture was completely wiped out in a complex struggle balancing potential prosperity with cultural identity. The complexity of the disappearance of the Khoisan from influence in Southern Africa is often seen as the Khoisan trading away their influence for livestock. The truth is the resistance of the Khoisan was a response and reaction to the disposition of the Boers. The downfall of the Khoisan came at the hands of violence that is often overlooked when considering the ethnic identities that vanished from the African continent in the 17th and 18th centuries.

See also
Cape Colony
Military history of South Africa

References

External links
South African Time Line with early history summarized.
Hunters and Gatherers: The Khoisan People of South Africa by Dr. Keith Tankard.

Military history of South Africa
Military history of the Cape Colony
Wars involving the states and peoples of Africa
Wars involving the Dutch Republic
1670s conflicts
1670s in Africa
1659 in Africa
1673 in Africa
1674 in Africa
17th century in the Cape Colony
Military history of the Dutch East India Company
African resistance to colonialism